Amherstdale is a census-designated place (CDP) in Logan County, West Virginia, United States, situated along Buffalo Creek. The CDP includes the unincorporated communities of Amherstdale, Becco, Fanco, and Braeholm. The CDP population was 350 as of the 2010 census. 

Prior to 2010, Amherstdale was part of the Amherstdale-Robinette CDP. Amherstdale has a post office with ZIP code 25607.

Amherstdale was also affected by the Buffalo Creek flood disaster which killed, injured, and left thousands homeless.

Geography
Amherstdale is in southeastern Logan County, in the valley of Buffalo Creek. It is bordered to the west and south by the Accoville CDP and to the east by Robinette.

References

Census-designated places in Logan County, West Virginia
Census-designated places in West Virginia
Coal towns in West Virginia